John Clark Ketcham (January 1, 1873 – December 4, 1941) was a politician from the U.S. state of Michigan.

Ketcham was born in Toledo, Ohio, and moved with his parents to Maple Grove, Michigan near Nashville, the same year. He attended the common schools of Barry County and high school at Nashville. He taught in rural and high schools from 1890 to 1899. Ketcham was county commissioner of schools for Barry County, 1899-1907, and chairman of the Republican county committee, 1902-1908. He was postmaster of Hastings, 1907-1914; master of the Michigan State Grange, 1912-1920; and lecturer of the National Grange, 1917-1921.

Ketcham was elected as a Republican from Michigan's 4th congressional district to the 67th United States Congress and to the five succeeding Congresses, serving from March 4, 1921, to March 3, 1933. He was an unsuccessful candidate for reelection in 1932, losing in the general election to Democrat George E. Foulkes.

Ketcham was president of the National Bank of Hastings, 1933-1937; State commissioner of insurance, 1935-1937; and counsel for the Michigan Chain Store Bureau, 1938-1941. He died in Hastings and was interred there in Riverside Cemetery.

He was the son-in-law, of Samuel Azariah Shelton, U.S. Representative from Missouri's 16th congressional district, 1921-1923.

References

John C. Ketcham at The Political Graveyard

1873 births
1941 deaths
Republican Party members of the United States House of Representatives from Michigan
People from Toledo, Ohio
People from Barry County, Michigan
People from Hastings, Michigan
State insurance commissioners of the United States